Joanna Marie Mussett Gosling (born 5 January 1971) is an English television news presenter, broadcast journalist and author. Until January 2023, she presented on the United Kingdom rolling news channel BBC News, also shown on BBC Two from 11am until 1pm, with additional presenting shifts on BBC News at One. Having previously worked for Independent Local Radio, Central Television in the Midlands and Sky News, she had been with the BBC since 1999.

Gosling is a graduate of the University of Birmingham from which she obtained a degree in French, and the University of Grenoble. She was married to Craig Oliver, who was British prime minister David Cameron's head of communications; the couple divorced in 2014. Her first book, Simply Wonderwoman – a guide for busy working women with children – was published in 2011.

Early life and education
Joanna Marie Mussett Gosling was born on 5 January 1971. The eldest of three children, Gosling was raised in Aylesbury, Buckinghamshire, where she was educated at Aylesbury High School. She was academic and had a flair for languages, and went on from school to study at the University of Birmingham, from where she has a degree in French. After graduating, she decided on a career in broadcast journalism. She attended the University of Grenoble in France, and had originally wanted to be a war correspondent.

Career
Gosling began her broadcasting career as a trainee reporter, completing a series of work placements at Birmingham's BBC WM, Fox FM in Oxfordshire and BBC Radio Scotland in Edinburgh, before securing her first full-time position with Independent Radio News where she read the news for Chris Moyles on Capital Radio. She worked as a freelance reporter for Central Television and later Sky News, and has been with the BBC since August 1999. As a presenter on BBC News 24, Gosling initially worked on the overnight slot when the channel was simulcast with BBC One and BBC World, before moving to the 9:00 am–1:00 pm morning shift with Ben Geoghegan, and then Phillip Hayton. Along with Hayton, she was part of the team which anchored coverage of the first anniversary of the September 11 attacks in 2002. In December 2003, she moved to a weekend evening slot on Fridays, Saturdays and Sundays with Chris Lowe. She had taken over from Anna Jones who moved to her old weekday slot alongside Hayton. During summer 2006, she also appeared as an occasional presenter on BBC Breakfast.

Between 2007 and 2013, Gosling presented the 7:00–10:00 pm shift on the BBC News Channel alongside Ben Brown from Monday to Thursday. Until February 2008, the slot included the programme News 24 Tonight. From 2013, she has presented from 11:00 am and 2:00 pm on the channel, also between Monday and Thursday. Gosling can also occasionally be seen presenting Bank Holiday evening and late bulletins of BBC Weekend News on BBC One. She is also occasionally seen on BBC One presenting news specials.

In April 2010, Gosling was at Heathrow Airport reporting on the events surrounding the air travel disruption following the eruption of Eyjafjallajökull which forced the closure of airspace throughout much of northern Europe. In May 2010, she was seen reporting from Westminster in the aftermath of the 2010 general election as Labour and the Conservatives tried to negotiate a deal with the Liberal Democrats to form a coalition government, and on 11 May broke the news that Gordon Brown would resign as Prime Minister.

She presented analysis of the televised economic debate following that programme on 23 June 2010 alongside Nicholas Owen, the programme being a response to the previous day's emergency budget, and in August interviewed the jazz singer Jamie Cullum as he prepared to give a concert as part of the 2010 Proms at London's Royal Albert Hall. In December 2010, she spoke to Matt Cardle, the winner of the seventh series of The X Factor, which had been announced the previous evening. On 29 April 2011, she was part of the BBC team which presented coverage of the wedding of Prince William and Kate Middleton. She presented the BBC News programme on 18 April 2017 that broke the news of Theresa May calling for a snap general election.

On 8 September 2022, she broke into regular programming on BBC One to inform viewers of the Queen Elizabeth II's medical condition. The Queen died later that afternoon.

On 26 January 2023, Gosling made her final appearance on the BBC News channel, having decided to leave the broadcaster after 23 years, and ahead of the planned merger of BBC News and BBC World News. 

In 2008, a clip involving Gosling was included in a list of five "corpsing" on air moments by Channel 4 News, corpsing being a term used in broadcasting to describe someone breaking into uncontrollable laughter live on air. While presenting on the BBC News Channel, she has a giggling fit after forgetting the name of her co-presenter, Julian Worricker.

She is briefly seen in the 2005 television film Supervolcano presenting a fictional breaking news item about an eruption of the volcanic caldera of Yellowstone National Park. She was a contestant on the 2015 series of Christmas University Challenge, where she represented the University of Birmingham alongside weather presenter John Hammond.

Publications
Gosling's first book, Simply Wonderwoman: A survival guide for women with too much to do, was published in October 2011 by Kyle Books. It is a guide for busy working women with children. The book was serialised in the Daily Mail. Her second, Homemade Simple: Stylish, Practical Makes for Living and Giving was published in September 2013. The book features a series of projects for making things for the home.

Personal life
In September 2009, Gosling was one of several BBC newsreaders to take part in a charity fundraiser in aid of Leonard Cheshire Disability and the Helen & Douglas House hospices. Gosling, Fiona Bruce, Kate Silverton, Sophie Raworth, and Emily Maitlis performed a medley of songs from The Sound of Music at the Newsroom's Got Talent contest in London, which was presided over by Piers Morgan and Arlene Philips. They lost out to a team from ITV News who performed songs from the musical film Grease. For the 2010 contest in September 2010, she joined Jeremy Vine, Ben Brown and Naga Munchetty to perform a rendition of The Human League's "Don't You Want Me?".

Gosling was married to Craig Oliver, a former Director of Communications for 10 Downing Street. The couple have three daughters. Gosling and Oliver separated in March 2014.

Gosling lives in West London in a house purchased in 2004 from the sports presenter Mark Pougatch. In July 2010, she appeared at the Chiswick Summer Fair where she commentated on the tug of war contest.

Business interests
She is director of Paya Ltd, a company she founded along with her husband in 2005. Oliver has served as company secretary, but declared his intention to relinquish that role on taking up his position at Downing Street.

Television

Bibliography
Simply Wonderwoman: A survival guide for women with too much to do: Kyle Books (2011): 
Homemade Simple: Stylish, Practical Makes for Living and Giving: Kyle Books (2013):

References

External links

Joanna Gosling at bbc.co.uk
Joanna Gosling biography at TV Newsroom
Joanna Gosling at Curtis Brown

1971 births
Living people
People from Aylesbury
Alumni of the University of Birmingham
Grenoble Alpes University alumni
British television newsreaders and news presenters
English reporters and correspondents
English television journalists
English women journalists
BBC newsreaders and journalists
ITN newsreaders and journalists
British radio journalists
English radio personalities
ITV regional newsreaders and journalists
Sky News newsreaders and journalists
People educated at Aylesbury High School
British women television journalists
British radio presenters
British women radio presenters